Débora Anahí López (born 20 February 1995) is an Argentine professional boxer who held the WBO female flyweight title from 2019 to 2022.

Professional career
López made her professional debut on 18 September 2015, scoring a four-round unanimous decision (UD) victory against Yisele Sosa (5–6, 3 KOs) at Club General San Martín in Junín, Argentina. 

After compiling a record of 15–0–1 (1 KO), winning the Argentine female flyweight title twice and the South American female flyweight title once, she faced Niorkis Carreno for the vacant WBO female flyweight title on 20 December 2019 at Social y Deportivo Camioneros in Luis Guillon, Argentina. López defeated Carreno via UD to capture her first world title. Two judges scored the bout 100–89 and the third scored it 98–91.

On March 19, 2022, she lost for the WBO's vacant Flyweight world title against countrywoman Tamara Elisabet DeMarco, who was 9-4, 0 knockouts in thirteen previous contests coming in, by a ninth round technical decision when Lopez suffered a severe cut after an accidental headbutt and was deemed unfit to continue. She was behind on two of the three judges' scorecards, so she lost by a split technical decision.

Professional boxing record

References

Living people
1995 births
Argentine women boxers
Sportspeople from Buenos Aires Province
Flyweight boxers
Super-flyweight boxers
World Boxing Organization champions